Santino Spinelli (born 21 July 1964) is an Italian Romani musician, composer and teacher.

Biography 
Spinelli, known professionally as Alexian, is the youngest of six children, the only brother among five sisters. He was born in Pietrasanta, in the province of Lucca, on July 21, 1964, the son of Gennaro and Giulia Spinelli. However, it was in Lanciano, in the province of Chieti, where he began his early studies. He attended the State Trade Institute P. De Giorgio and earned two degrees from the University of Bologna, the first in Foreign Languages and Literature and the second in Musicology. He has been Professor of the Romani Language and Culture at the University of Chieti since 2008.

Spinelli is the founder and president of the cultural association Thèm Romano (Romani World). In 2001 he was elected sole representative for Italy at the parliament of the International Romani Union (IRU), a nongovernmental organization based in Latvia and active in the field of Roma people's rights. In 2002 Spinelli taught the Romani language and culture at the University of Trieste, and later at the Polytechnic University of Turin. In 2003 the IRU Parliament appointed him Ambassador of Romani Culture and Art throughout the world, and in 2007 he was appointed Vice President of the IRU. He is the national president of the federation FederArteRom and UCRI spokesman.

Spinelli's poem "Auschwitz" is engraved on a memorial to the Sinti and Roma people killed during the Nazi period. The memorial is near the Bundestag in Berlin. He had a similar memorial built in Lanciano, in the piazzale Edith Stein. It was sculpted from Majella stone by sculptor Tonino Santeusanio.

In 2010 he published the "Carovana Romanì" for accordion, ensemble and orchestra through Ut Orpheus of Bologna. The collection contains scores composed by Spinelli that were performed at the seat of the Council of Europe in Strasbourg and the Council of the European Union in Brussels. On June 2, 2012, he sang the Murdevele (the "Lord's Prayer" in the Romani language) in Milan for Pope Benedict XVI on the occasion of the World Meeting of Families. 
On 26 October 2015, with the Alexian Group, he performed several of his compositions, including Murdevele, for Pope Francis.

On April 18, 2016, Mayor Ing. Gianfranco Lopane of Taranto conferred honorary citizenship on Spinelli. In May 2018 he was awarded the silver medal and the Diploma of the Sacred Military Constantinian Order of Saint George on the occasion of the tricentenary of the Ecclesiastical Bull of Pope Clement XI. On February 4, 2020, President Mattarella awarded him the honor of Commander of the Order Merit of the Italian Republic.

Publications 
 "Carovana Romanì" (orchestral score) - Ut Orpheus, Bologna, 2010
 Rom, Genti Libere - with a preface by Moni Ovadia, Dalai Editore, Milano, 2012
 Rom, Questi Sconosciuti - with a preface by Moni Ovadia, Mimesis Edizioni, Milano, 2016

See also

 Romani people in Italy

References

External links
Official site
Them Romanò

1964 births
Living people
Romani musicians
Italian Romani people
Academic staff of the D'Annunzio University of Chieti–Pescara
University of Bologna alumni